The Khalid ibn al-Walid Army ( Jaysh Khalid ibn al-Waleed) was an armed Salafi jihadist group active in southern Syria. It was formed by a merger of the Yarmouk Martyrs Brigade, the Islamic Muthanna Movement, and the Army of Jihad on 21 May 2016. The faction controlled a strip of territory southeast of the Golan Heights, and was in conflict with other forces of the Syrian rebels. The group was defeated and lost all of its territory to the Syrian Government on 31 July 2018, with many members surrendering. Many captured members of the Khalid Bin Walid Army were executed on the same day.

Ideology
The Khalid ibn al-Walid Army is named after a medieval Muslim commander named Khalid ibn al-Walid who led jihad on several regions in and around Arabia. The Khalid ibn al-Walid Army enforced the Islamic State’s form of Sharia. In the small pocket the group controlled, its fighters forced women to wear niqabs and men to wear loose trousers and to grow long hair and beards. Since 2016, the group has executed more than 20 people, mostly in the town of Shajara, by beheading. The group had also locked smokers in cages and amputated people on allegations of theft.

History

The group was named after Khalid ibn al-Walid, who led the Muslim armies in the Battle of Yarmouk in 636 CE, which inflicted a heavy defeat on the Byzantine Army and led to the Muslim conquest of the Levant.

The date on the document declaring the establishment of the group is 14 Sha'aban 1437, corresponding to Saturday 21 May 2016 and is signed by Abu Hashim al-Shami (also known as Abu Hashim al-Hamawi), the emir of the group.

On 14 August 2016, the Khalid ibn al-Walid Army launched a major attack against the Army of Conquest-held town of Hawd al-Yarmouk; however, despite heavy fighting and losses on both sides, no progress was made.

In November 2016, the Khalid ibn al-Walid Army exchanged fire with an Israel Defence Force unit stationed in the Golan Heights, according to former Israeli defense minister Moshe Ya'alon. According to Aymenn Jawad Al-Tamimi, the reported apology "was deemed to be a misconception."

The group launched another offensive against the rebels in February 2017.

On 3 July 2018, the group became involved in the 2018 Southern Syria offensive, after launching an attack on pro-government forces in Western Daraa. They were the suspected perpetrators of a coordinated series of attacks near As-Suwayda on July 25 that killed more than 250 people and injured scores more.

In September 2019, the group released photos of a captured Syrian government intelligence officer in Daraa and later executed him.

On 5 November 2019, fighters from Wilayat Hawran released photos after the death of ISIL's leader Abu Bakr al-Baghdadi, pledging allegiance to his successor Abu Ibrahim al-Hashimi al-Qurashi.

On 22 December 2019, Wilayat Hawran announced that its fighters managed to kill 2 Russian soldiers in the town of Nawa.

See also

ISIL territorial claims

References

Salafi jihadists
Syrian civil war
Golan Heights